Tell Begum is a tell, or archaeological settlement mound, in Iraq. It is located near Said Sadiq in the Shahrizor Plain in Iraqi Kurdistan. The site was first investigated in 1960 by a team of Iraqi archaeologists. In 2013, a new excavation was carried out by archaeologists from Leiden University. This project restudied the older excavations and also conducted limited new excavations.

The oldest excavated layers date to Late Halaf period. After an apparent hiatus in occupation, the site was resettled in the Late Chalcolithic 1 (LC1) period and continued to be in use into the Late Chalcolithic 3 (LC3) period (4300-3600 BC). Medieval occupation has also been attested.

References 

Archaeological sites in Iraq
Sulaymaniyah Governorate
Halaf culture
Ubaid period
Tells (archaeology)